Hope Street or Hope St. may refer to:

Places
 Hope Street, Liverpool
 Hope Street, in the Cowcaddens are of Glasgow, Scotland
 Hope Street, Providence, Rhode Island
 Hope Street, downtown Los Angeles, California

Fiction
 Hope Street (TV series), a BBC television series set in Northern Ireland
 Hope Street, a novel by Terry Deary

Music

Albums
 Hope St. (Kassidy album)
 Hope Street (album), an album and song by Stiff Little Fingers

Songs
 "Hope Street", by Converge from You Fail Me, 2004
 "Hope Street", by The Levellers from Zeitgeist, 1995

See also
 "A Street Called Hope", a song by Gene Pitney, 1970